Marie Joan Winch (commonly known as Joan Winch, born 9 June 1935) is an Indigenous Australian nurse and educator.

Biography

Winch was born on 9 June 1935 in Perth, Western Australia. Her mother died when she was 13.

Winch began working with the Perth Aboriginal Medical Service in 1975. She founded the Perth Aboriginal Medical Service at the Marr Mooditj college. She was awarded a PhD in Aboriginal Studies in May 2011 by the Centre for Aboriginal Studies.

Winch passed away in March 2022.

Awards

 WA Citizen of the Year: 1986
 Western Australian Aboriginal of the Year: 1987
 Australian Aboriginal of the Year: 1987
 World Health Organisation Sasakawa Award for Primary Health Care Work: 1987
 John Curtin Medal: 2008

References

1935 births
Living people
Australian nurses
Indigenous Australian academics
Indigenous Australian women academics
Australian midwives
Curtin University alumni
Australian women nurses
Academic staff of Curtin University
Australian women academics
People from Perth, Western Australia
Sasakawa Health Prize laureates